The 2020 AFC U-16 Championship qualification was an international men's under-16 football competition which decided the participating teams of the 2020 AFC U-16 Championship.

The AFC announced the cancellation of the final tournament due to the COVID-19 pandemic on 25 January 2021.

Draw
All 47 AFC member associations teams entered the competition.

The draw was held on 9 May 2019 at the AFC House in Kuala Lumpur, Malaysia.

West: 25 teams from West Asia, Central Asia and South Asia, were drawn into six groups: one group of five teams and five groups of four teams (Groups A–F).
East: 22 teams from ASEAN and East Asia, were drawn into five groups: two groups of five teams and three groups of four teams (Groups G–K).

The teams were seeded in each zone according to their performance in the 2018 AFC U-16 Championship final tournament and qualification (overall ranking shown in parentheses; NR stands for non-ranked teams). The following restrictions were also applied:
The eleven teams which indicated their intention to serve as qualification group hosts prior to the draw were drawn into separate groups.

Notes
Teams in bold qualified for the final tournament.
(H): Qualification group hosts
(Q): Final tournament hosts, automatically qualified regardless of qualification results

Player eligibility
Players born on or after 1 January 2004 were eligible to compete in the tournament.

Format
In each group, teams played each other once at a centralised venue. The eleven group winners and the four best runners-up qualified for the final tournament. The matches were played between 14 and 22 September 2019.

Tiebreakers
Teams were ranked according to points (3 points for a win, 1 point for a draw, 0 points for a loss), and if tied on points, the following tiebreaking criteria were applied, in the order given, to determine the rankings (Regulations Article 9.3):
Points in head-to-head matches among tied teams;
Goal difference in head-to-head matches among tied teams;
Goals scored in head-to-head matches among tied teams;
If more than two teams are tied, and after applying all head-to-head criteria above, a subset of teams are still tied, all head-to-head criteria above are reapplied exclusively to this subset of teams;
Goal difference in all group matches;
Goals scored in all group matches;
Penalty shoot-out if only two teams are tied and they met in the last round of the group;
Disciplinary points (yellow card = 1 point, red card as a result of two yellow cards = 3 points, direct red card = 3 points, yellow card followed by direct red card = 4 points);
Drawing of lots.

Groups

Group A
All matches were held in Jordan.
Times listed are UTC+3.

Group B
All matches were held in Uzbekistan.
Times listed are UTC+5.

Group C
All matches were held in Iran.
Times listed are UTC+4:30 on 18–20 September, UTC+3:30 on 22 September 2019.

Group D
All matches were held in Saudi Arabia.
Times listed are UTC+3.

Group E
All matches were held in Qatar.
Times listed are UTC+3.

Group F
All matches were held in Kyrgyzstan.
Times listed are UTC+6.

Group G
All matches were held in Indonesia.
Times listed are UTC+7.

Group H
All matches were held in Vietnam.
Times listed are UTC+7.

Group I
All matches were held in Singapore.
Times listed are UTC+8.

Group J
All matches were held in Laos.
Times listed are UTC+7.

Group K
All matches were held in Myanmar.
Times listed are UTC+6:30.

Ranking of second-placed teams
Due to groups having different number of teams, the results against the fifth-placed teams in five-team groups were not considered for this ranking.

Qualified teams
The following 16 teams qualified for the final tournament.

1 Bold indicates champions for that year. Italic indicates hosts for that year.

Goalscorers

Notes

References

External links
, the-AFC.com
AFC U-16 Championship 2020, stats.the-AFC.com

Qualification
2020
U-16 Championship qualification
2019 in youth association football
September 2019 sports events in Asia